Road crossing may refer to:

 Road intersection
 Railroad crossing (or level crossing)
 Pedestrian crossing
 Strand Road Crossing, a terminus in the United Kingdom

See also
 
 
 Road (disambiguation)
 Crossing (disambiguation)
 Bike crossing (disambiguation)